Robert John Bjorklund (June 12, 1918 – January 27, 1994) was an American football center who played one season with the Philadelphia Eagles of the National Football League (NFL). He was drafted by the Pittsburgh Steelers in the 20th round of the 1941 NFL Draft. He played college football at the University of Minnesota and attended North Community High School in Minneapolis, Minnesota.

References

External links
 Just Sports Stats
 

1918 births
1994 deaths
American football centers
American football linebackers
Camp Peary Pirates football players
Minnesota Golden Gophers football players
Philadelphia Eagles players
Players of American football from Minneapolis
North Community High School alumni